Hibbertia scopata is a species of flowering plant in the family Dilleniaceae and is endemic to the Northern Kimberley region of Western Australia. It is a small shrub with wiry branches, lance-shaped leaves with the narrower end towards the base, and yellow flowers arranged singly along the branches, with thirteen to fifteen stamens arranged in groups around two densely scaly carpels.

Description

Taxonomy
Hibbertia scopata was first formally described in 2010 by Hellmut R. Toelken in the Journal of the Adelaide Botanic Gardens from specimens collected near the mouth of the Drysdale River in 1993. The specific epithet (scopata) means "densely covered with bristly hairs".

Distribution and habitat
This hibbertia grows in sandstone crevices near the Drysdale River mouth in the Northern Kimberley region of northern Western Australia.

Conservation status
Hibbertia scopata is classified as "not threatened" by the Government of Western Australia Department of Parks and Wildlife.

See also
List of Hibbertia species

References

scopata
Flora of Western Australia
Plants described in 2010
Taxa named by Hellmut R. Toelken